Luanshya is a town in Zambia, in the Copperbelt Province near Ndola. It has a population of 117,579 (2008 census). 

Luanshya was founded in the early part of the 20th century after two prospector/explorer, William Collier shot and killed a Roan Antelope on the banks of the Luanshya River, discovering a copper deposit in the process. The antelope fell to the ground, its head resting on a rock where an exposed seam of copper ore was visible. The mining company eventually formed to exploit Collier's find was named "Roan Antelope Copper Mines Ltd".

For most of the 20th century, copper was mined in great quantities at Luanshya but towards the end of the century, mining there became increasingly uneconomic, causing a severe recession in the town. There is still a fair amount of copper underground. Whether the town sees a revival in its fortunes will depend on how efficiently the copper is extracted and sold.

The city is the birthplace of folk singer, John Edmond, writer A. C. Grayling and former Vice President of Zambia, the late George Kunda.

The Roan Antelope Rugby Club in Luanshya formerly held the record for highest goal posts in the world, which were recognised by the Guinness Book of Records. They were 110 ft, 6 inches high.

Myth 
A popular myth is that there was a river snake which was held responsible for the floodings and deaths during the early development work at Roan Antelope Mine.  Roan's workers suffered such high illness and mortality rates from malaria and blackwater fever, as well as from typhus, dysentery and pneumonia, that the mine had great difficulty keeping African laborers from one week to the next. It became common knowledge that the local Lamba attributed these problems to a giant snake, which wriggled along the river and mine shafts causing floodings and cave-ins, and spewing poisonous gas.  By 1928, construction of the plant and township had begun soon after reserves of approximately 20 million tons of copper had been found. The flooding problem was solved when the Luanshya River was channeled and its swamps drained during the 1929-32 anti-malaria campaign.

The death rate from the epidemic that occurred during the early days of mine development earned the town the nickname of Valley of Death which some people latched on to as the real meaning.  However, Luanshya means river of antelopes due to the many antelopes that were found in the area before mining settlements drove them away.  Places thus named are Luanshya River, Luanshya Stream, Luanshya Town and Luanshya Township.  The name for the Town is said to have been derived from the Luanshia mining claim.  Three mining claims were named after antelopes, Rietbok, Roan Antelope and Luanshia Mining Claims.

For those who are confused about the meaning of the name it is better to think of it in this manner "Once upon a time there was a river and stream which derived its name from the antelopes that would go to drink from there.  Then some foreigners came and found some copper and started mining works on the land.  In the style of the local chiefs, they also adopted the two animal totems and named their mine after the antelopes, roan being the mpelembe, nsha being the duiker.  They amassed a lot of wealth from the mine and lived happily ever after."

Education 

Luanshya is the home base of a Technical and Vocational Teacher's College (TVTC) from which a generation of the country's teachers in technical subjects have graduated. The town also has Luanshya Technical and Business College (LTBC) offering technical subjects to tertiary students. LTBC and TVTC are just separated by fence, and across the road to the West is Da Gama school, one of the only school on the Copperbelt Province for people with disabilities, is managed by nuns and named after the famous Portuguese explorer Vasco da Gama.

Before Independence, schools were racially segregated, with separate schooling for Europeans, Asians, "Cape Coloureds" and Africans.  There were two schools for white pupils: Luanshya Primary School which is now called Central and Luanshya High School. There was Asoka Primary School for Asians, later named Gandhi, near the Second Class Trade area. For Africans there was Arusha Primary School in Mikomfwa, Mwaiseni in Mpatamatu and Fisansa in Roan townships.

After independence, more schools were built. In Mikomfwa, new schools were Ndelela, East School now Twatemwa, West School now Muchinshi, Mipundu, Mikomfwa and Arusha was later renamed Bwananyina. In Roan Township there were Roan, Chaisa, Makoma, Kafubu primary schools, while Mpatamatu had Mpatamatu, Nkulumashiba, Nkambo, primay schools. Luanshya township had Rivercross, Harrison now Mpelembe, Convent now known as Buteko.

SECONDARY SCHOOLS: Mikomfwa township had no secondary school, Luanshya township had Luanshya High School for boys and Luanshya Girls High school, Roan township had only Roan Antelope and Mpatamatu township had Mpatamatu secondary.

Economic activity

During Zambia's painful privatisation period, thousands of miners were laid off by the Indian run RAMCOZ. During the Presidency of Levy Mwanawasa, the town was revived when Luanshya Copper Mines resumed full scale mining production and hired thousands of people, although that was to be short lived when the mining operator ran into financial problems.

The mines were quickly taken over by a Chinese firm. The Chinese workforce has been accused of gross negligence and flouting Labour laws.

In 2011 three Chinese workers were arrested for allegedly molesting local girls by taking advantage of their deprived economic status. Early in 2012, then Minister for Labour and Sport and area Member of Parliament Chishimba Kambwili made a surprise stop over at the multimillion-dollar Mulyashi Mine Project only to be turned away by its Chinese employers.

While the opening of the mines may have brought some social problems to Luanshya,  employment rates have risen and revived the town. The population has been steadily increasing and more economic activities are visible such as the installation of a new Soya Solvent extraction plant, as well as the extension of a well known milling company. The agricultural sector is growing as small scale farmers are increasing their crop outputs to cope with growing demand. Main crops that are harvested include maize, wheat, and soybeans.

Healthcare

The town has three hospitals:

 Roan General Hospital – acute care facility with emergency facilities
 Thomson Hospital – government district hospital
 Luanshya Hospital

Politics

Luanshya currently has two constituencies, Luanshya Central covers much of the urban area whilst Roan Constituency encompasses most of the peri-urban areas.

For a long time, the town was a bastion for the fallen ruling party the Movement for Multy-Party democracy (MMD). However, during the wind of change that swept across the country in the last General Elections, the Patriotic Front notched up two important victories with popular businessman Steve Chungu riding on the party name elected as Lunshya Central M.P whilst outspoken Minister of Sport Chishimba Kambwili re-elected for the Roan seat.

There have been however calls for a youth representation from the district, 21-year-old Law student and native of Luanshya, Kasabo Kalussa claims most youth's feel left out. Kalussa, the controversial rising politician and political blogger cites the astronomical unemployment levels as the reason why the local youths feel disenfranchised.

In the 1960s, Luanshya was known as the "Garden Town of the Copperbelt".  This was largely due to the efforts of the late Bill and Doreen Altern, who initiated impressive public parks and gardens. Nowadays, the garden town has few social amenities for youths and mostly with dilapidated and neglected infrastructure.

Kalussa laments that this has had a knock on effect on many youths who find themselves between the shocking levels of unemployment and poverty. Recently, Luanshya recorded a high rate of alcohol and substance abuse resulting in the newly sworn in government to close down numerous unlicensed pubs across the country.
The current Mayor of the city is Chola Magaret. He was born in 1975.

Locally the town is headed by the Town Clerk and his executive council consisting of five directors:

 Administration
 Finance
 Engineering
 Social Services 
 Planning
 Environmental Housing

There is a 30-member council consisting of 28 elected members and 2 members from the national Parliament.

Transportation

Air
Luanshya Airport (ICAO: FLLA) is a small airstrip located in the eastern part of the town called Ndeke to mean "Air plane". The airstrip is not currently operational and consists of a rough unmarked 4,199 foot landing strip. A flying club is located at the airstrip.

The town is accessible by two airports:
 Simon Mwansa Kapwepwe International Airport in Ndola
 Southdowns Airport in Kitwe

Land

Luanshya is at the end of a spur road that comes off the main Ndola to Kitwe route.  There are a few roads that connect Luanshya to other parts of Zambia (a road going east to Kafulafuta and a road heading south to Masaiti and Mpongwe).

Zambia Railways service to Luanshya was freight only, namely to service nearby copper mine with traffic to and from Ndola. The railway line from Luanshya to Ndola was vandalised by scrap metal dealers. At present Luanshya and Ndola are no-longer connected by a rail line. The copper mined from Luanshya is now transported by road to the outside market.

Many of the urban roads in Luanshya are named after trees and as such the initial letter of the Tree alphabetically are given the commonly used name of that road. Ie Datura Ave became D avenue. Eucalyptus Ave became E ave etc....Many of the roads are listed in alphabetical order so that A, B, C, D, E, F avenues are in alphabetical order and ran parallel with each other. The other groups of the alphabet are also grouped together in parallel lines H, G, J and l in a place called New Town although K, O, P, W avenue is right on the other side of town and ran parallel to N avenue.

Notable people
Folk singer John Edmond was born in Luanshya on 18 November 1936.
Philosopher Anthony Clifford Grayling was born in Luanshya on 3 April 1949.

References

External links 
 Website with history & photographs of Luanshya
 Luanshya Facebook group

 
Populated places in Copperbelt Province